Jens Krag-Juel-Vind (15 June 1724 – 30 April 1776), Baron of Juellinge, was a Danish nobleman, Supreme Court justice and landowner.

Early life and education
He was born at Juellinge (now Halsted Priory), the son of Jens Juel-Vind (1694-1726) and Ide Helle Margaretha, Baroness Krag (1697-1738). He had two sisters. His father died when he was just two years old and Juellinge was then managed by his maternal uncle Niels Juel Reedtz (1699-1742) of  Palsgaard and by Joachim Gersdorff.  Krag-Juel-Vind studied at the University of Hannover from 1741 and at the University of Copenhagen from 1743.

Career
He served as an accessor in the Danish Chancellery from 1745 to 1756. On 17 October 1746, he was appointed as squire (kammerjunker). From 11 February 1747, he held a seat at the Supreme Court without access to vote. From 2 January 1750, he served as Supreme Court justice. On 30, October 1756, he was appointed as chamberlain (kammerherre).

He was less active as Supreme Court justice from 1764 but voted for the last time on 23 December 1771. From 27 October 1756 to 16 December 1769, he served as  governor (amtmand) of Copenhagen County. He was a member of the Royal Copenhagen Shooting Society from 1766. In 1764, he was awarded the Ordre de l'Union Parfaite. He was made a knight in the Order of the Danneborg in 1766.

In 1769-1774, he was a member of a commission regarding the extra taxes in Copenhagen. In 1769-1771, he served as justitiarius at the Supreme Court. In 1772, he was one of nine judges in the trial of royal physician  Johann Friedrich Struensee (1737–1772).  On 14 May that same year he was appointed as provisor for Vallø Castle. In 1773, he became a member of the  Executive Board (Overskattedirektionen). On 13 July 1774, he became curator for Vemmetofte Adelige Kloster. On 21 October 1774, he was appointed as Privy Councilor (gehejmekonferensråd). On 30 August 1771, he was granted a patent on the surname Krag-Juel-Vind and the associated coat of arms. He served as chief legal officer for the Danish Asiatic Company from 1775.  On 25 May 1780, he became a member of the Law Revision Commission.

Property
Upon the death of his father in 1726, he succeeded as the holder of the Barony of Juellinge.
In 1738, he also inherited the estate ( stamhuset) of Stensballegaard at Horsens following the death of his mother, Ida Helle Margarethe Krag.

Personal life and legacy
 
He married Sophie Magdalene von Gram  (1734-1810)  on 6 April 1752 in Christiansborg Chapel in Copenhagen. 
She was the daughter of Carl Christian von Gram (1703-1780) and Birgitte Christiane Frijss (1715–75). Her father was the Danish chief of magistrates.

They had six children of which only three survived to adulthood:
  Frederik Carl Krag-Juel-Vind-Frijs  (9 January 1753 -10 April 1815)
 Sophie Magdalene Krag-Juel-Vind (4 July 1754 - 9 February  1833)
 Jens Carl Krag-Juel-Vind-Arenfeldt (12 October 1767 - 12 August 1855)

During the 1750s, Krag-Juel-Vind and his wife donated an altarpiece and a canopy for the baptismal font to  Halsted Church. Both feature their coats of arms and are still present in the church. In 1751, they financed a refurbishment of the church.

Jens Krag-Juel-Vind died on 30 April 1776 at Juellinge. He was buried on 16 May in the Juel burial chapel at  Halsted Church. His marble sarcophagus by neoclassical sculptor, Johannes Wiedewelt (1731–1802), was transferred to  Uth  Church in 1802.

Ancestry

References

External links

 Lensbaron Jens Krag-Juel-Vind, til baroniet Juellinge

1724 births
1776 deaths
People from Lolland
University of Hanover alumni
University of Copenhagen alumni
Barons of Denmark
18th-century Danish landowners
Danish civil servants
Supreme Court (Denmark) justices
Knights of the Order of the Dannebrog
Ordre de l'Union Parfaite
Krag family
Juel family